Montpellier 2 University (Université Montpellier 2) was a French university in the académie of Montpellier. It was one of the three universities formed in 1970 from the original University of Montpellier. Its main campus neighbors the Montpellier 3 University's main campus, and for this reason the nearest tramway station is named "Universities of Sciences and Literature" rather than "University of Sciences". In January 2015, Montpellier 1 University and Montpellier 2 University merged into the Montpellier University (Université de Montpellier).

History 
The creation of the imperial University by Napoleon I in 1808 stimulated the
formation of a number of faculties of Humanities and of Science in the main cities of the French Empire.

At that time, Montpellier had already a long-established medical college and a school of Pharmacy, but also a respected Royal Society of Sciences created in 1706. In 1810, a Faculty of Science started with initially seven chairs: mathematics, astronomy, physics, chemistry, zoology, botany, and mineralogy.

In 1879, the faculty created a research station of marine biology in Sète, and, twelve years later, and Institute of Botany (which is still part of University Montpellier 2). The Institute of Chemistry, created in the same period, became the Ecole Nationale Supérieure of Chemistry of Montpellier in 1941.

In 1964, the faculty left the centre of Montpellier to settle in a  30 hectare campus to the north of the city on which 146 000 m2 of buildings for teaching and research were built.

Heritage 

The University Montpellier 2 retains the Institute of Botany of Montpellier (created in 1889 by Professor Charles Flahault), which is close to the botanical garden of University Montpellier 1.  Partly demolished after World War II, most of the buildings date from 1956. The building houses a prestigious herbarium, the largest in France after the national museum of natural history, with approximately 4 million samples and an important collection of botany vellums, and research laboratories in the fields of ecology and parasitology.
The station of marine biology in Sète has been part of the university since 1879.

In addition to these collections, the university's media library brings together its old collections of printed works, manuscripts, and iconography (including, for example, the library of the work of Felix Dunal, bequeathed to the Faculty of Science in 1856). These collections are publicly accessible given a reasonable request.

The university is also the seat of the Pôle universitaire de Montpellier which collectively represents the higher education establishments in the Languedoc-Roussillon region.

Overview of University Montpellier 2 

Université Montpellier 2 is a research-intensive university where education and research cover most of the Scientific and Technological fields:
 Biodiversity, Ecology, Evolution, Environment
 Biology, Agronomy
 Biology and Health
 Chemistry
 Education
 Management
 Mathematics, Informatics, Physics and Systems 
 Universe, Earth, Water

It is partnered with 40 joint research units, 1 observatory and divided into 7 specialised faculties.

Education

The university curriculum follows the LMD system, which divides higher education into 3 diplomas: 
Licence (Bachelor's degree, 3 years of Higher Education) 
Master (Master's degree, 2 years after bachelor's degree)
Doctorat (PhD, 3 years after master's degree)

The university is divided into 7 specialised faculties:
  The Faculty of Science
 The École polytechnique universitaire de Montpellier
 3 University Institutes of Technology (IUT) 
  IUT Montpellier-Sète
  IUT Nîmes
  IUT Béziers
  The Montpellier School of Management (IAE) (belongs to a Institut d'Administration des Entreprises IAEs network of 31 IAEs throughout France)
  The Faculty of Education

And 6 doctoral schools.

Research

Université Montpellier 2 is composed of about forty research departments in:
 Biodiversity, Ecology, Evolution, Environment
 Biology, Agronomy
 Biology and Health
 Chemistry
 Education
 Management
 Mathematics, Informatics, Physics and Systems 
 Universe, Earth, Water

The whole research activity is carried out collaboratively with the leading national research organisations (CNRS, Inserm INSERM, Institut national de la recherche agronomique INRA, Cirad CIRAD, Ird IRD, Brgm, CEA, CNES, Ifremer, Inria, Irstea).

Rankings

 2014 QS world university rankings
 51 – 100th for the Earth and Marine Sciences field 
 101 – 150th for the Agriculture & Forestry field 
385th worldwide 
 2013 Academic Ranking of World Universities: 201 – 300th worldwide
 Times Higher Education under 50 universities: 32nd worldwide 
 National Taiwan university: 294th worldwide

See also 

 University of Montpellier
 List of public universities in France by academy

Notes 

University of Montpellier
Educational institutions established in 1970
1970 establishments in France
Universities and colleges in Montpellier
Educational institutions disestablished in 2015
2015 disestablishments in France